Guanine nucleotide-binding protein G(I)/G(S)/G(O) subunit gamma-5 is a protein that in humans is encoded by the GNG5 gene.

References

Further reading